Reftarıdil Kadın ("resurrection"; 1838 – 3 March 1936) was the second consort of Sultan Murad V of the Ottoman Empire.

Early life
Reftarıdil Kadın was born in about 1838. She was a noble Circassian-Abkazian from Hatko family and had two sisters Terandil Hanım and Ceylanyar Hanım. Ceylanyar was given to Dr. Mehmed Emin Pasha. She then married Hacı Nazıf Bey, and was renamed Melek. She had two children, a daughter, and a son named Rüşdü Bey. Terandil, while stayed with Reftaridil, and then married Nuri Bey, and went to live in Aksaray.

Marriage
Reftarıdil married Murad, during the reign of Sultan Abdulmejid I, when he was still a prince on 4 February 1859 in the Dolmabahçe Palace. She was twenty, while he was eighteen. She was his second consort after Mevhibe Kadın. After Abdulmejid's death in 1861, and the accession of his brother Sultan Abdulaziz, Murad became the crown prince. Reftarıdil, who was pregnant at the time, gave birth to her only child, a son, Şehzade Mehmed Selaheddin, on 5 August 1861 in the apartments of the crown prince in located in the Dolmabahçe Palace. It was still technically forbidden for Ottoman princes to have children before becoming sultans, but Abdülaziz, who had himself had a son before ascending the throne, made an exception for Murad's child. 

Murad and his consorts lived in a mansion in Kurbağalıdere, which was allocated to him by Abdulaziz. They used to spend their winters in the crown princes apartments located in the Dolmabahçe Palace and the Nisbetiye Mansion. She was a lovely lady with a pink skin, large blue eyes, straight nose, and a round face. She was also honest and goodhearted. She loved music and reading and was highly educated and always well informed on current affairs. She always smiled.

Murad ascended the throne on 30 May 1876, after the deposition of his uncle Sultan Abdulaziz, Reftarıdil was given the title of "Second Kadın". After reigning for three months, Murad was deposed on 30 August 1876, due to mental instability and was imprisoned in the Çırağan Palace. Refarıdil also followed Murad into confinement. She was widowed at Murad's death in 1904, after which her ordeal in the Çırağan Palace came to an end.

Last years and death
After Murad's death she lived first with his son and, after the dynasty was exiled, in a house in Ortaköy, where she also hosted Şayan Kadın, Murad's third consort. She was allowed to stay in Istanbul as she was only a widowed consort and not a blood member of the dynasty. Although she lived in precarious times and was in a tight financial situation, she was always cheerful and smiling. After the passing of the Surname Law, she took the name Reftaridil Hatgil. She died on 3 March 1936.

Issue

In literature
 Reftarıdil is a character in Ayşe Osmanoğlu's historical novel The Gilded Cage on the Bosphorus (2020).

See also
Kadın (title)
Ottoman Imperial Harem
List of consorts of the Ottoman sultans

References

Sources

 

1839 births
1936 deaths
19th-century consorts of Ottoman sultans
20th-century consorts of Ottoman sultans
People from the Ottoman Empire of Circassian descent